The New Zealand Air Training Corps (also known as Air Cadets and ATC) is one of the three corps in the New Zealand Cadet Forces, alongside the New Zealand Sea Cadet Corps and the New Zealand Cadet Corps. It is funded in partnership between the Royal New Zealand Air Force (RNZAF) and local communities, with its members being civilians. Members are under no obligation to enlist in the New Zealand Defence Force. Should a cadet enlist, their service in the ATC cadet does not translate into higher pay, rank, or seniority. 

The mission of New Zealand Air Training Corps is to develop and enable self-disciplined, confident and responsible young people. The vision is to prepare New Zealand's successful leaders of tomorrow.

As of 2021 the Air Training Corps has approximately 2,000 personnel, including 202 commissioned officers.

History

British Roots 
In the late 1930s, with the increase of military aircraft technology and the decrease of war-time resources, the Royal Air Force (RAF) struggled to find sufficient numbers of suitable recruits. To overcome this problem, the Air League of the British Empire launched its Air Defence Cadet Corps in 1938, replaced by the Air Training Corps in February 1941. It ran in schools with the aim to train boys aged 16–17.5 so they could enter the RAF at the age of 18 without needing to complete basic training.

Foundation and World War II 
The first proposal to form an Air Corps in New Zealand came in August 1940 from the Governor General, Lord Galway. Early the following year, a review of aircrew requirements found that there would be difficulty obtaining sufficient recruits by the end of 1942.

Authority was given by War Cabinet in February 1941 to form an Air Cadet Training Corps, the name subsequently being standardised as Air Training Corps. "Town" and "School" units were set up in major cities, training young men between 16.5 and 18 years of age. The first squadron was No 1 SQN in Wellington. With New Zealand considered to be at risk from Japanese invasion and the British not in a position to help, its purpose was to train potential airmen in basic airmanship and provide an insight into Air Force work to prepare young men for the RNZAF when they came of age.

The ATC peaked during World War II at approximately 9200 cadets and had provided 3500 recruits to the RNZAF. By the end of the war, unit numbers had risen to 105 town units and 64 school units. However, when the war ended in August 1945, unit and cadet numbers began to decline.

Post World War II and Compulsory Military Training 
The introduction of Compulsory Military Training (CMT) brought a period of crisis for the ATC. If the RNZAF could get sufficient recruits from interested CMT trainees there would be little need for an ATC. Premises were in poor shape, equipment was short, and there was a serious shortage of instructors. It was decided that the Corps lacked good officers, and that the regular force provided insufficient assistance. Steps were taken to improve the ATC reducing the lower age limit to 15 years, closing some smaller units and holding a refresher course for instructors.

CMT was abolished again in 1958 and replaced by the ballot system of conscripted service for randomly selected 20-year-old males, which operated between 1960 and 1970. By 1964 the Combined Cadet Forces reached a peak strength of 198 units, with 1000 officers and about 56,000 cadets.

Modernization and Restructuring 
The Corps remained part of the Royal New Zealand Air Force until 1971 when the Government decided to disband it. This caused a public outcry, with tremendous support from such organisations as the Returned Services Association, Brevet Clubs and the Air Force Association, and the Government was forced to reconsider its decision. Reorganisation saw many schools cease cadet support. By 1970 Sea Cadet and Air Training Corps (ATC) units had decreased to 55 units with 3,200 cadets.

From 1972 the ATC separated from the RNZAF and came under the umbrella of the newly formed New Zealand Cadet Forces, along with the Sea Cadets and New Zealand Cadet Corps as a voluntary organisation under the Minister of Defence's responsibility. The open units were required to be initiated and funded by the community. The Chief of Defence Forces was authorised to "direct and supervise" the Cadet Forces and provide military support, initially restricted to providing uniforms, training and some equipment at a cost of no greater than $400,000.

Although no longer an integral part of the services, the ATC is still administered by the Ministry of Defence. Under new legislation, the Air Cadet League was formed for the purpose of providing a supporting and funding role, although part of the annual Defence vote was, and still is, allocated to the Cadet Forces.

Centralised supervision was established under a Commandant. Regular Force Defence personnel, under the control of the Commandant, provided support units at five locations around New Zealand. ATC Officers ceased to have "Queen's Commissions" and were appointed by the Minister of Defence with Cadet Force commissions, effectively remaining civilian volunteers on an unpaid basis with authority to wear military uniform and rank.

In 1978, as a result of the Human Rights Act, Women were accepted in the Air Training Corps for the first time. In 1990, No. 38 (Wigram) Squadron of the NZCF was the first to appoint a female Cadet Unit Commander. 

Around the same time, the vision of the NZCF changed to become a force based predominantly on adventure and youth development with a military flavour, rather than one based primarily on military training and preparation for the Armed Forces. The aim of this new thrust was to teach “good citizenship skills” to Cadets.

By 1985 the ATC had increased to 50 units. A resurgence of interest since 1989, attributed to the movies such as Top Gun and Iron Eagle, saw unit numbers expand to around 100 units, many in areas that did not previously have Cadet units.

ATC Golden Jubilee and the new Millennium 

In 1991 the ATC celebrated its Golden Jubilee. To celebrate and raise its public profile, cadets from every unit in New Zealand participated in a run that started at either end of the country and converged in Wellington. Along the way money was collected and donated to CANTEEN-teenagers with cancer.

In 2001 the ATC celebrated its Diamond Jubilee with special parades held in each area. By this time the ATC comprised 52 Squadrons from Kaitaia to Invercargill and approximately 2500 cadets.

2002 saw the introduction of Disruptive Pattern Material as an official uniform of the Air Training Corps.

At the beginning of 2010, there were 103 Cadet Force units In New Zealand, and cadet numbers were approximately 4500 with 360 cadet officers.

Air Training Corps' 75th Anniversary 
The ATC celebrated its 75th Anniversary in 2016 with numerous exercises and parades held around the country.

Southern area 

Southern area held exercise Southern Falcon at the West Melton Aerodrome, just west of Christchurch. More than 100 cadet force personnel attended, from nine units across the country. Cadets had the opportunity to fly in an RNZAF C-130H as well as visits to aviation facilities around Christchurch. The event ended with a formal dinner at the Air Force Museum.

Central area 

Central area held exercise Silver Sparrowhawk at RNZAF Base Ohakea. The exercise had an attendance of over 150 personnel from nine units all over the lower North Island and functioned as both a celebration and as a friendly competition between central area ATC Squadrons. Activities included flights on RNZAF NH-90 helicopters, a Pōwhiri welcoming the ATC on to the RNZAF Tūrangawaewae. Cadets also participated in a "Village Green", which included a tug of war, fitness tests, observation exercises, and rogaining.  No. 10 (Palmerston North) Squadron was awarded the winning trophy for the event.

Northern area 

Northern area celebrated the anniversary with a combined parade with all seven of the Auckland ATC Squadrons. This event combined with the 76th anniversary of the Battle of Britain saw more than 320 cadets parade for the Chief of the Air Force, Air Vice Marshall Tony Davies, at the Auckland War Memorial Museum.

Air Training Corps' 80th Anniversary 
The year 2021 saw the New Zealand Air Training Corps celebrate the 80th year since its formation.

In Auckland the seven local Squadrons joined with units outside of Auckland and the Auckland Air Force Association to mark both the 80th anniversary of the Air Training Corps and the annual Battle of Britain commemoration service.

Organisation

National
The ATC is managed at a national level by the Commandant (usually a Regular Force Lieutenant-Colonel/Wing Commander/Commander), and their Staff based out of Trentham Army Camp. It is supported by the Air Training Corps Association of New Zealand (ATCANZ).

Area
The country is divided into 3 areas, Northern (Northern half of the North Island), Central (Southern half of the North Island) and Southern (entire South Island). Each area has a NZCF Cadet Force Training and Support Unit (CFTSU), commanded by an Area Coordinator, with Advisors for Air Training Corps Squadrons.

Unit

Each unit is managed by the Cadet Unit Commander, in partnership with the unit's branch of the ATCANZ. A typical unit has between one and four officers filling various roles. The Cadet Unit Commander appoints all personnel in the unit to their positions. Each unit has an Adjutant, Training Officer, and Stores Officer. These positions are usually filled by a commissioned officer (officers can hold multiple positions if necessary). One or more of these personell may have assistants, often junior officers or senior Non-commissioned officers (NCOs).

Each unit has a cadet NCO holding the position of Squadron Warrant Officer (who doesn't necessarily hold the rank of Cadet Warrant Officer). If the unit is large enough, each flight of cadets may have a Flight Sergeant. The Warrant Officer is normally responsible for supervising the NCOs in their various tasks. The Warrant Officer can skip the normal chain of command to liaise directly with the Unit Commander.

How an individual unit is organised varies widely. A unit's organization depends on its size, number of officers, number of Cadet NCOs, facilities, and the organisational preference of the Cadet Unit Commander.

Cadet units are graded on their parading numbers, which dictates the number of officers each unit may have, and the number of Corporals, Sergeants, Flight Sergeants and Officer Cadets.

Air Training Corps Association of New Zealand (ATCANZ) 
The Air Training Corps Association of New Zealand was formed as a result of the Defence Act 1990. This is the secondary support body of the New Zealand Air Training Corps, behind only Headquarters New Zealand Cadet Forces.

The association has a branch in every ATC squadron, made up of up to eight members of that unit. These members are usually parents of cadets belonging to that squadron, however other persons involved in the unit are also able to serve as committee members. The method of selecting committee members is by election of self-nominated personnel during a general meeting. The Cadet Unit Commander or a delegate Officer from the unit is also expected to be a sitting member of the committee to ensure that the branch is both kept informed of squadron activities and that the branch aligns its practices with the Unit Commanders intent and direction.

Each branch has three elected positions: Chairperson, Secretary and Treasurer. People self-nominate for these positions then face election by the general committee.

Meetings

Local branch general meetings 
Branches convene for annual general meetings shortly after the end of each financial year to elect new position holders and decide strategy for the next year. These meetings are often held at the relevant cadet unit's headquarters or the nearest Royal New Zealand Returned and Services' Association (RSA). Special meetings normally occur on a monthly basis or whenever needed depending on the operational tempo of the squadron.

National council annual general meetings 
Each year the ATCANZ National Council holds an Annual General Meeting. A representative from every ATCANZ branch is invited to attend so the location is chosen to be most convenient for travel. In recent years this has been at RNZAF Base Ohakea.

The purpose of this meeting is to facilitate the meeting of every unit's ATCANZ branch and allow them to coordinate on a national level. Often the Minister of Defence will be in attendance, as well as the Commandant NZCF, Assistant Commandant NZCF, and Returned Serviceman Association leadership.

Scholarships and awards 
Each year ATCANZ provides a number of scholarships to Air Training Corps Personnel, including,
 The Sainsbury Awards
 Partial funding for cadets participating in the International Air Cadet Exchange
 Partial funding for cadets participating in the National Aviation course
 Partial funding for cadets participating in the National Gliding course

Further prizes are given to cadets on Air Training Corps aviation courses;

Uniform and Insignia

Insignia and Badges 

The uniform worn by ATC members is the same as that of the Royal New Zealand Air Force, except that for all ranks, the lettering on the bottom of the rank insignia shoulder boards reads "CADET FORCES" rather than "NEW ZEALAND" to differentiate ATC personnel from RNZAF personnel. Officer Service Dress Uniforms have a shoulder flash reading "NEW ZEALAND CADET FORCES" rather than "ROYAL NEW ZEALAND AIR FORCE" for the same reason. Cadets wear a cloth "ATC" cap badge on their flight caps, while officers and officer cadets wear the same cap insignia as RNZAF officers.
Since 2019, all ATC personnel wear dark blue oval badges with "AIR TRAINING CORPS" on their shoulders to differentiate them from the RNZAF.
Cadets wear a shoulder brassard on their right arm to display their individual achievements, which further distinguishes them from RNZAF personnel. Cadet achievements include The Duke of Edinburgh's Award, flying/navigation badge, marksman badge and training level badges, and the number and name of the squadron they parade with.
Commissioned Officers, Officer Cadets, National, and Area Warrant Officers do not wear brassards.

Uniforms 
The Air Training Corps follows the Royal New Zealand Air Force (RNZAF) with regard to uniform standards and clothing items. All mandatory clothing is issued by the RNZAF. 

Before December 2020, each unit was graded on the number of personnel who attended parade nights, and based on this grade, received an annual allowance for cadets' uniforms. 
Since December 2020, new uniform is issued directly new cadets upon their enrolment into a squadron after their measurements are entered into CadetNet. Units still maintain a local supply of uniform as spares, but the bulk of uniform issued to new recruits comes from Headquarters New Zealand Cadet Forces.

The Air Training Corps currently uses the following uniforms:

Air Cadet Working Dress 

In 2018 the NZCF identified that DPM was no longer a viable uniform for the Air Training Corps. This stemmed from the NZDF moving away from the uniform entirely. With there no longer being a source of NZDPM the organisation started exploring new uniforms. The product of that exploration is the 'Cadet Working Dress' (CWD).

Intended to be introduced in late 2021 the Sea Cadet Corps and Air Training Corps have adopted a single multipurpose uniform that replaces the New Zealand Disruptive Pattern Material (DPM) currently used by the Air Training Corps as its No. 8 Field Service Uniform. The Air Training Corps will adopt the uniform first to free up DPM for the New Zealand Cadet Corps. The style of the uniform is modeled off the RNZAFs General Purpose Uniform however lacks the flame retardant feature of the RNZAF version, this isn't seen as a necessity due to cadets rarely catching fire. These modifications and bulk order result in a uniform that is practically affordable to the organisation. The Sea Cadet variant will retain the darker blue colour of the RNZN General Working Dress, by be identical otherwise.

Cadets and Officers will be issued a set of Cadet Working Dress upon being issued their general purpose uniform (No. 6 GP) as part of the integrated logistics platform that will see new cadets issued a 'pack' of equipment and uniform from New Zealand Cadet Forces Headquarters.

As well as the key components (Shirt, Pants, Boots), the New Zealand Cadet Forces intends to role out accessories such as matching rain jackets for cadets to either be supplied with outright, or purchase through the NZCF directly. More accessories are yet to be announced however warm weather equipment such as jerseys, wind breakers, and high visibility vests have been speculated by NZCF personnel.

The supplier for the Cadet Working Dress is based in Fiji. As a result, the 2021 outbreak of COVID-19 production and shipping of CWDs was reduced, delaying the introduction of the uniform.

Role out of the uniform commenced in July 2021, with more than 300 personnel receiving their uniform by 18 July. By 11 August every Squadron in the South Island had been equipped with Cadet Working Dress with the issuing of CWD to commence in the North Island (Central and Northern Area) shortly thereafter.

Unit Recognition Patches 
 
Subject to approval by the Commandant NZCF, Units are authorized to design and produce Unit Recognition Patches (URP) for their personnel to wear. For the Air Training Corps, authorized Unit Recognition Patches are square 80mm x 80mm patches fastened by Velcro to Cadet Working Dress.

Unit Recognition Patches may only be worn by members belonging to that particular unit. Although they're commonly gifted to other units as signs of goodwill and friendship. The New Zealand Cadet Forces operate the NZCF logo as a recognition patch, although these are only worn by personnel attached to Headquarters NZCF, or Cadet Force Training and Support Units (CFTSUs).

Ranks 
All active Air Cadets are able to work towards being promoted. The size of each unit dictates the quantity of each rank that a unit is allowed.

Non-Commissioned Officer Ranks 
Cadet Non-Commissioned Officer ranks are based on the RNZAF ranks, and are:

The CDT prefix/suffix is used to distinguish regular force personnel from those of the cadet forces. The only other difference is that in the RNZAF, LAC stands for Leading Aircraftman

However, whilst not all cadets become NCOs, all get the chance to train and progress through the different levels of training, Basic 1, Basic 2, Proficiency, and Advanced levels, by demonstrating knowledge and skills in subjects including cadet forces knowledge, general service knowledge, leadership, firearms safety, and aviation.

As of early 2007, the Chief of Air Staff has accepted the introduction of the rank of Leading Air Cadet (LACDT).  This is not regarded as an NCO rank but will be awarded to those cadets showing obvious leadership skills or to give seniority to long-serving or older cadets who may not otherwise have been given a chance to go on a junior NCO course. This is the Air Training Corps equivalent to the NZCC Lance Corporal and Sea Cadet Corps' Able Cadet.

Commissioned Officer Ranks 
Air Training Corps Officers also follow RNZAF Ranks, and are.

While New Zealand Cadet Forces Officers hold commissions on behalf the New Zealand Parliament, via the Minister of Defence. They are not entitled to be saluted by New Zealand Defence Force personnel. Due to the rank emblems being identical other than the "New Zealand" and "Cadet Forces" identifier, occasionally Cadet Force Officers are saluted by NZDF personnel, if this happens Cadet Force Officers are encouraged to return the salute to be polite.

New Zealand Cadet Force Officers do not hold precedence of rank over NZDF personnel e.g. a Cadet Force Squadron leader has no authority to issue orders to a NZDF Pilot Officer or Non-Commissioned Officer.

New Zealand Cadet Force Officers continue to undergo training throughout their career, following the yet to be released NZCF 170O.

Membership

Cadet members 
Interested personnel can join between the ages of 13 to 15 (or if attending the first year of high school) and can stay on without being promoted to the age of 18. Senior Non-Commissioned Officers may serve until their 20th birthday.

Other than black lace up shoes, all uniform is provided upon enrolment into a unit and completion of a training camp where wearing of the uniform is taught. Bonds are sometimes held to ensure that they are returned.

Fees 
Unit fees are set by each unit Parent Support Committee annually. Due to fluctuating operating costs, these vary from unit to unit dependent on the type of activities the unit has planned, although typically fees will be no more than $200 annually.

Adult members

Adult Cadets 

In 2017 the New Zealand Cadet Forces updated their Child Protection policy surrounding cadets who are either Non-Commissioned Officers or personnel who are completing cadet level training that are aged 18 and over.

There is a deliberate delineation between an 'Adult' and an 'Officer' as the latter has specific authority to exercise command and control over cadets and other NZCF Officers.

The key difference between a cadet who is an adult and a cadet who is under 18 is that adult cadets and indeed all adults within the New Zealand Cadet Forces are charged with the responsibility of maintaining the safety and welfare of cadets during all NZCF activities. While this doesn't mean that cadets who are classified as adults hold authority over other cadets due to their age, it means that adult cadets are expected to at the very least vocalize to an Officer or Supplementary Staff member when they believe safety and welfare have been compromised.

Cadet Non-Commissioned Officers who are 18 or older are issued a thin white band which is sewn into the rank slide of the individual immediately above the "CADET FORCES" lettering and below the rank emblem.

Officers and Supplementary Staff 
Adult Members can serve in two capacities: Commissioned Officers or Supplementary Staff. Officers are commissioned into the New Zealand Cadet Forces, with the post-nominal letters NZCF, at the rank of Pilot Officer, and can be promoted to Flying Officer, and Flight Lieutenant after completing the necessary training and service.

In 2014 the organisation introduced a new position of National Support Officer (NSO). This position was designed to place a New Zealand Cadet Force Officer at high level of influence within HQNZCF, which traditionally had his position had been solely occupied by New Zealand Defence Force Personnel. In 2016 with the adoption of the continental staff system the position was renamed to Assistant Commandant. If he or she is an ATC officer, as opposed to an NZCC or SCC officer, they will hold the rank of Wing Commander.

Supplementary Staff or SS for short, are civilians who help train cadets. They do not wear uniform, but they are generally treated similarly to officers by cadets. Members of the NZDF are occasionally attached to cadet units to assist in conducting training. This is normally because they know a cadet/officer in that unit, or if they have a particular interest in cadet forces. They are addressed as "Instructor" or by cadets choice, "Sir" or "Ma'am".

Fees 
Most NZCF Officers do not pay any membership fees, this is typically to balance the time and effort put in by NZCF Officers. While Officers aren't encouraged to, a large amount contribute anyway, by way of purchasing stationary and equipment for their unit.

Activities

The Duke of Edinburgh's Hillary Award

Officers and Adults 
Any Commissioned Officer in the  NZCF or Supplementary Staff member that has an active security clearance is eligible to become an award facilitator, allowing cadets within their unit to actively participate in the award and allows any progress towards the award to be signed off. There is no limit to the number of staff members that can be award facilitators, allowing larger units to focus a staff member to each section of the award.

While the award is directed towards young adults and within the NZCF specifically, the cadets and NCOs, Junior Officers and adults under the age of 25 are also eligible to complete any of the awards (although the Gold award would be the most reasonable).

Cadet Participation 
Run in partnership with the Duke of Edinburgh's Hillary Awards the award is a multi year, voluntary, non-competitive programme of practical, cultural and adventurous activities, designed to support the personal and social development of young people aged 14–25, regardless of gender, background or ability. It offers an individual challenge and encourages young people to undertake exciting, constructive, challenging and enjoyable activities in their free time.

Personnel undertaking the award can begin the activity either through their school, a third party provider, or the New Zealand Cadet Forces with more than 9,000 young adults undertaking the programme each year.

Within the frame of the New Zealand Cadet Forces, parade nights and community service events like Anzac Day parades can count towards the service requirement while weekend camps and courses can count towards the skill section of the awards. The Cadet Fieldcraft Activity can also count towards the Adventurous Journey for all three awards. Cadets are also able to retroactively claim work up to 3 months of work they've done before signing up for their first award. For example, if a cadet completed a NZCF promotional course such as the Senior Non-Commissioned Officer Course shortly before signing up for an award, then they would be able to retroactively use the course for their residential project.

Cadets that successfully complete an award are entitled to wear the pin of the highest award they receive on their brassard (if Air Training Corps or New Zealand Cadet Corps) or Jacket (if Sea Cadet Corps).

Parade Nights
Every unit holds Parade Nights around 2–4 hours long weekly during school terms. Each parade night usually begins and ends with a parade. The starting parade is used to raise the RNZAF ensign, to inspect uniforms, and to inform the cadets on the parade night's activities. The final parade is used to lower the RNZAF ensign. They are then informed either during parade or at a debrief of upcoming events in the unit. Between the parades, the cadets undergo classroom or practical instruction.

Flying
Units teach aviation theory as part of the parade nights, and units typically organise practical Flying Training for the cadets in partnership with local Aero Clubs. There is an annual National Aviation Course, consisting of separate Flying and Navigation flights. Those that opt for the Flying component spend two weeks covering both theory and practical lessons in flying, with First Solo being a common achievement for those over 16 years of age. The Navigation component is a 1-week long theoretical and practical course covering the NZ CAA Private Pilot Licence syllabus.  The practical content included 4 navigation flights building up from an initial 30 minute map reading exercise to a full two hour Navigation exercise covering up to  distance. As of 2021 the cost of attending the aviation courses for Air Cadets has increased, with the cost per person for those attending the two courses required to pay the following:

 National Power Flying Course – $1,000 (NZD), this up from $650 that has typically been charged (which was unadjusted for 6 years).
 National Navigation Course – $440 (NZD)

Gliding
As with Flying, Gliding Training is organised by the unit in partnership with local Gliding Clubs. There is one annual week-long Gliding Course, which is held at Matamata aerodrome. Cadets from all over New Zealand may attend this week-long course. As of 2021 the cost of attending the national gliding course has increased, with the cost per person for those attending the two courses required to pay the following:

 National Gliding Course – $550 (NZD)

Field Craft Activity
Most units conduct classroom training in bushcraft and survival skills and hold regular Basic and Advanced bushcraft camps in the local area during weekends. The Cadet Fieldcraft activity, renamed and reshaped from the all encompassing 'bushcraft course', is a nine-day course that provides Cadets with an enhanced practical experience in field craft to further their outdoor skills training. The course is divided in to two components, the cadet section which offers between 30 and 60 cadets the opportunity to travel around the country to meet and interact with cadets from other squadrons. Separately the course serves to train Commissioned Officers to be able to lead and manage cadets on day tramps and/or overnight camps on clearly formed tracks in and below the bush line. Officers are taught leadership, risk and crisis management, bush craft skills, and first aid.

The course is held either at RNZAF Dip Flat in the South Island, Waiouru Army base in the North Island, or occasionally Tekapo Army Camp south west of Christchurch.

Shooting
Units conduct regular range training with small-bore rifles. Some units have their own armories and ranges at their parade hall. Cadets must pass a Dry Firing Training Test (DFTT) before being allowed on the range. Cadets who achieve high marks regularly on the range may be awarded a marksmanship badge to be worn on their brassard.

Public Service 
Each year the New Zealand Cadet Forces participate in numerous public service events around the country. Anzac day represents the most public and personnel intensive deployment for cadet force personnel, often involving the bulk of the units forces. Cadets will form cenotaph and catafalque parties on behalf of, and in partnership with the New Zealand Defence Force.

Another high-profile public service that the NZCF participate in is the annual Poppy Day drive by the RNRSA, where cadets and RSA members work together to raise funds towards helping New Zealand Veterans and the RNRSA.

International Air Cadet Exchange (IACE) 

The International Air Cadet Exchange is an annual exchange program organized by the International Air Cadet Exchange Association.

The New Zealand Air Training Corps each year sends a dozen members of the organization to countries all over the world. The participants can be any rank and a Commissioned NZCF Officer accompanies each group of cadets overseas, providing opportunities for both adult and youth members.

Local Training

Cadets 
Each Squadron trains at least one night per week – a "parade night" in order to undertake the Cadet Development Framework Each squadron employs a training officer whose role it is to create and implement a local training programme. The Cadet Development Framework is a four-year program which provides cadets with the opportunity to develop skills in leadership, aviation knowledge, drill, firearms training, fieldcraft, and more.

The programme provides standardisation for training and expected development within Cadet Units for CDT – CDTW/O. Some content is applicable to all three Corps of the NZCF, whilst some is specific to particular Corps.

The content of the Four-Year Training Programme is not designed to fill every period during parade nights in a calendar year, but intentionally leaves scope for Cadet Unit Commanders to add content that will add value to their communities, strengthen Unit identity and provide opportunities for cadets that they may not receive outside of NZCF. However, only completion of the prescribed training will ensure that cadets can continue moving through the development model. Delivery of the content of the Four-Year Training Programme is at Cadet Unit Commander's discretion. In time, further resources to assist in delivery will be developed, including parade night lesson plans, instructor guides and additional resources. Currently available resources should be used in the first instance for delivery of training. Where gaps in knowledge or skills exist, Area Advisors and/or Area Support Officers should be engaged.

The training is split in to three different levels off learning that correspond with a cadets progression.

 Lead Self – Years 1-2
 Lead Teams – Year 3+
 Lead Leaders – Year 4+

Courses

Tri-Corps Courses
 Junior NCO Course
 Senior NCO Course
 Cadet Fieldcraft Activity
 Officer Fieldcraft Activity
 Officers Commissioning Course
 Range Conducting Officers Course
 Officers Instructional Technique & Training Management Course
 Officers' Command Course
 Shooting Coaches' Course

ATC-only Courses
 National Aviation Course – Power Flying
National Aviation Course – Navigation
 National Gliding Activity
 Air Force Experience

Competitions

Aviation Skills Competition
The Aviation Skills Competition (AVSKILLS), is a set of three competitions held across New Zealand, each open to ATC squadrons in their area. This is followed by a national competition, pitting the three winners against each other to determine the top squadron in the country. The competition aims to test cadets on their teamwork, comradeship and capabilities. Cadets are tested on various aspects of their training, including rifle shooting, GSK & CFK (knowledge of the NZDF and NZCF respectively), first aid, drill and navigation.

Air League Trophy – Area and National Efficiency Competition
At some point in the year, nominated squadrons are inspected by their Area Co-ordinator. They judge them on their standards of drill, knowledge of the ATC curriculum, and general efficiency in running the unit.  The three winning squadrons are then inspected by New Zealand Defence Force staff who determine the most efficient unit nationally. Units that win the national competition are awarded the Air League Trophy.

Davy Memorial Drill Competition

The Davy Drill Competition is a Ceremonial Drill competition held annually, in each of the three areas. The competition is only open to the Air Training Corps and must consist of no less than 12 people in a marching formation, with one parade commander, which is to be of a Senior NCO rank. The winner of each area's competition moves onto the National Competition.

The winner of the National competition wins the Davy Memorial Trophy, which was donated in memoriam of Hr. H.A.C Davy, who was the Dominion President of the Air Training Corps Association for a number of years.

Shooting Competitions

Wallingford Shooting Competition

The Wallingford Shooting Competition represents the New Zealand Air Training Corps national shooting competition. All NZCF Air Training Corps squadrons are eligible for the competition.

Air Commodore S. Wallingford CB, CBE, who was for many years President of the RNZAF Small Arms Association, donated this trophy for team postal competition to encourage rifle shooting in the Air Training Corps. This cup is awarded to the winning team of the Air Training Corps small-bore postal shoot

This competition also represents one of the only opportunity for Air Training Corps personnel to earn the NZCF Marksman Badge. In order to be awarded the badge a cadet must, while competing in the Wallingford Shooting Competition achieve a score of 80% or more. The other Two Badges are awarded under this competitions ruleset.

There is a common misconception that NZCF personnel can only attain the marksman badge in the Wallingford competition. This is not the case. The NZCF 160 Competitions and Awards Manual states the following.

Ffennell Shooting Competition
The Ffennell competitions are a group of small-bore rifle matches for the youth of the Commonwealth. New Zealand Cadet Forces units contest the Class B competitions (using issued rifles and sights). The matches are held under the authority of the Commonwealth Postal Competitions Committee (CPCC). All international correspondence on behalf of the CPCC will be handled by the Council for Cadet Rifle Shooting.

The aim of these team matches is to encourage the Youth of the Commonwealth to participate in the sport of small-bore target rifle shooting.

Entry is open to any unit or sub-unit of the following:

 New Zealand Cadet Forces;
 Junior Servicemen of the New Zealand Defence Forces in one establishment; and
 Other youth groups approved by the CPCC.

Units may enter one or more teams. Each team shall consist of eight firers. A shooter cannot shoot on more than one team. The team captain may or may not be one of these eight. All members of the team must be under the age of 19 years on the day of firing the match, and be serving members of the same unit or sub-unit.

Each team member will fire two cards, 10 rounds to count being fired at each card, with two rounds fired at each aiming mark. Sighting shots will be completed before the practice begins. The whole team need not complete shooting in one day. Highest Possible Score (HPS) is 200. Team HPS is 1600.

See also
 List of squadrons in the New Zealand Air Training Corps

International Air Cadets Organisations 
 Australian Air Force Cadets
Air Training Corps (UK)
Royal Canadian Air Cadets
Civil Air Patrol (US)
Hong Kong Air Cadet Corps

References

External links
Air Training Corps Association of New Zealand (ATCANZ)
New Zealand Cadet Forces

New Zealand Cadet Forces
Youth organisations based in New Zealand
Air Cadet organisations